Lipu may refer to:

LIPU, the Lega italiana protezione uccelli (En. "Italian League for Bird Protection")
Lipu, Estonia, village in Maidla Parish, Ida-Viru County, Estonia
Padua Airport, serving Padua, Veneto, Italy

China
Lipu County (荔浦县), Guilin, Guangxi
Lipu, Jinhua (澧浦镇), town in Jindong District, Jinhua, Zhejiang
Lipu, Sanmen County (浬浦镇), town in Sanmen County, Zhejiang
Lipu, Zhuji (浬浦镇), town in Zhuji, Zhejiang
Lipu, Li County (澧浦街道), a subdistrict in Li County, Hunan Province
Lipulekh Pass at the triple border point of Burang County, Tibet Autonomous Region; Uttarakhand state, India; and Darchula District, Nepal